Hugh [probably Gaelic: Aodh], was the third successor of Ferchar mac in tSagairt as Mormaer of Ross (1323–1333).

Biography
Hugh de Ross was the eldest son and heir of William II, Earl of Ross by his wife Euphemia de Berkeley, or Barclay.

Hugh was a favorite of King Robert I of Scotland, who endowed him with many lands. Hugh even married Robert's sister, Matilda/Maud Bruce (c. 1287 - aft. September 1323), in 1308 in the Orkney Isles. Hugh's young brother, John, married Margaret Comyn, heiress of Buchan (although he died childless).

Marriages and issue
Hugh de Ross married twice: 

(1) Matilda (Maud) de Brus, sister of Robert I "the Bruce", King of Scots, and daughter of Robert de Brus, 6th Lord of Annandale and his wife Marjorie, Countess of Carrick; married in 1308. 
Hugh and Matilda had several children:
 William de Ross III, oldest son and successor, made Earl of Ross on 17 May 1336. 
 Marjory de Ross, wife of Malise, 8th Earl of Strathearn
 John de Ross, who died on 27 May 1364 without issue.

(2) Margaret de Graham, daughter of Sir John de Graham of Abercorn; married by Papal dispensation dated 24 November 1329. 
Hugh and Margaret had two known children:
 Hugh de Ross of Rarichies, first of Balnagown; declared heir to the earldom of Ross in 1350; was a hostage for the return of David II King of Scotland from the English in 1351.
 Euphemia de Ross, married (1) John Randolph, 3rd Earl of Moray and (2) by dispensation (due to affinity) Robert Stewart, Earl of Strathearn, subsequently Robert II, King of Scots (1371–1390) as his second wife. Euphemia is sometimes incorrectly assigned as a daughter of Matilda, but this would have involved consanguinity in the 2nd and 3rd degrees which was not stated in the dispensation for her marriage to Robert Stewart. 
Hugh and Margaret are often also assigned a daughter Janet, wife of Sir John de Monymusk. This has been found to be erroneous, as Janet was actually Janet de Barclay, daughter of Margaret de Graham by her 2nd husband, John de Barclay of Gartley. All received prestigious marriage partners, including to the earls of Buchan and Moray, to Maol Íosa IV, Earl of Strathearn and the future king Robert II.

Death
He was killed along many other Scottish nobles at the Battle of Halidon Hill on 19 July 1333, and was succeeded by his son and successor, William.

Notes

Bibliography
 Barrow, G.W.S., Robert Bruce and the Community of the Realm of Scotland, (Edinburgh, 1988)
 Sir James Balfour Paul, Scots Peerage, Vol. VII:234-237
 John P. Ravilious, The Ancestry of Euphemia, Countess of Ross: Heraldry as Genealogical Evidence, The Scottish Genealogist Vol. LV, No. 1 (March 2008), pp. 33–38

1333 deaths
Clan Ross
Earls of Ross
People from Ross and Cromarty
Scottish deaths at the Battle of Halidon Hill
Year of birth unknown
14th-century Scottish earls